Two Arts Plaza will be an 18-story class-A office skyscraper located at Routh Street and Spur 366 (Woodall Rodgers Freeway) in the Arts District of Downtown Dallas, Texas (USA).

See also
 One Arts Plaza

References

External links 
Two Arts Plaza
 One Arts Plaza
 The Billingsley Company

Office buildings completed in 2007
Skyscraper office buildings in Dallas